Manitoba Colony may refer to:

 Manitoba Colony, Bolivia
 Manitoba Colony, Mexico